Nue (French for naked), is Lara Fabian's fifth album, and first French release in four years, since Pure.

Track listing

Credits
 Rick Allison : Guitar, Piano, Arranger, Programming, Clavier, Basse
 Kate Barry : Photography
 Janey Clewer : Piano
 Julie Leblanc : Choir, Chorus
 Cathi Leveille : Choir, Chorus
 Kim Richardson : Choir, Chorus
 William James Ross : Arranger
 Dorian Sherwood : Percussion, Choir, Chorus

Charts

Certifications

References

2001 albums
Lara Fabian albums
Polydor Records albums